Cesati is a surname. Notable people with the surname include:

 Roberto Cesati (born 1957), Italian footballer
 Vincenzo de Cesati (1806–1883), Italian botanist

See also
 Cesari

Italian-language surnames